Biddulph is a civil parish in the district of Staffordshire Moorlands, Staffordshire, England. It contains 61 listed buildings that are recorded in the National Heritage List for England.  Of these, six are at Grade II*, the middle of the three grades, and the others are at Grade II, the lowest grade.  The parish contains the town of Biddulph and the surrounding area.  In the parish is Biddulph Grange, a country house, which is listed together with a number of decorative features in its garden and grounds.  The other listed buildings include houses and associated features, cottages, farm houses and farm buildings, churches and items in churchyards, a wayside cross, three milestones, a drinking trough, a tower, the engine house of a former coal mine, a school, almshouses, bridges, and two war memorials.


Key

Buildings

References

Citations

Sources

Lists of listed buildings in Staffordshire
Biddulph